The 2008 NCAA Division I Women's Lacrosse Championship was the 27th annual single-elimination tournament to determine the national champion of Division I NCAA women's college lacrosse. The championship game was played at Johnny Unitas Stadium in Towson, Maryland during May 2008. All NCAA Division I women's lacrosse programs were eligible for this championship, and a total of 16 teams were invited to participate.

Northwestern defeated Penn 10–6 to win their fourth overall, as well as fourth straight, national championship. This would subsequently become the fourth of Northwestern's seven national titles in eight years (2005–2009, 2011–12).

The leading scorer for the tournament was Hilary Bowen from Northwestern (23 goals). Bowen was also named the tournament's Most Outstanding Player.

Tournament field
A total of 16 teams were invited to participate. 8 teams qualified automatically by winning their conference tournaments while the remaining 8 teams qualified at-large based on their regular season records.

Play-in games

Seeds

1. Northwestern
2. Penn
3. Maryland
4. Virginia
5. Syracuse
6. Georgetown
7. Boston U.
8. Princeton

Teams

Tournament bracket 
The first two rounds were held on campus sites.

All-tournament team 
Carolyn Davis, Duke
Lindsey Gilbride, Duke
Hilary Bowen, Northwestern (Most Outstanding Player)
Maggie Bremer, Northwestern
Christy Finch, Northwestern
Meredith Frank, Northwestern
Morgan Lathrop, Northwestern
Hannah Nielsen, Northwestern
Melissa Lehman, Penn
Rachel Manson, Penn
Hilary Renna, Penn
Megan Mosenson, Syracuse
Halley Quillinan, Syracuse

See also 
 NCAA Division II Women's Lacrosse Championship 
 NCAA Division III Women's Lacrosse Championship
 2008 NCAA Division I Men's Lacrosse Championship

References

NCAA Division I Women's Lacrosse Championship
NCAA Division I Women's Lacrosse Championship
NCAA Women's Lacrosse Championship